"Old Man Emu" is a song written and recorded by the Australian country singer John Williamson. In 1970, Williamson performed the song on TV talent show, New Faces, winning first place. Williamson signed with Fable Records after the win.

"Old Man Emu" was released in May 1970 as Williamson's first single and the lead single from his album, John Williamson. The song peaked at number 4 on the Kent Music Report and was certified gold in Australia

Track listing

Charts

Weekly charts

Year-end charts

Release history

References 

John Williamson (singer) songs
1969 songs
1970 debut singles